The Wolf Burn is a small stream, running from a suspect subterranean source behind the Ormlie housing estate in Thurso, Highland Region in the United Kingdom.  Its issue is by Burnside, Caithness.  A ribble of stones represents the Wolfburn distillery  which operated for a number of decades around the mid 19th Century.

Few historical records exist, although it is thought to have been owned by a William Smith, and is known to have been present on the first Ordnance Survey map of the region in 1872.  It is thought to have been abandoned by 1877.

It is currently under threat from the local council who are planning on building a road that would destroy all the remains along with the plethora of wildlife including nesting sites of the endangered Skylark.

Caithness
Rivers of Highland (council area)